The 1904 Kentucky State College Blue and White football team represented Kentucky State College—now known as the University of Kentucky—during the 1904 Southern Intercollegiate Athletic Association football season. Led by first-year head coach Fred Schacht, the Blue and White compiled an overall record of 9–1.

Schedule

References

Kentucky State
Kentucky Wildcats football seasons
Kentucky State College Blue and White football